Ian Galen Darling (born 27 October 1962) is a British Circuit judge.

He was educated at Winchester College and King's College London (LLB, 1984). He was called to the bar at Middle Temple in 1985 and served as a Recorder from 2003 to 2009.

He has been a judge at Inner London, Blackfriars, Snaresbrook and Wood Green Crown Courts.He has two children, Alfie and Athena born in 2004 and 2006.

His late mother (Ann Darling OBE) who was a magistrate. His brother Paul Darling is a QC.

References

1962 births
Living people
People educated at Winchester College
Alumni of King's College London
Members of the Middle Temple